AM-6545 is a drug which acts as a peripherally selective silent antagonist for the CB1 receptor, and was developed for the treatment of obesity. Other cannabinoid antagonists such as rimonabant have been marketed for this application, but have subsequently been withdrawn from sale because of centrally mediated side effects such as depression and nausea. Because AM-6545 does not cross the blood–brain barrier to any significant extent, it does not produce these kinds of side effects, but has still been shown to effectively reduce appetite and food consumption in animal studies.

See also 
 CB-13 – a peripherally selective cannabinoid agonist
 O-2050 – a centrally active CB1 silent antagonist
 Methylnaltrexone – a peripherally selective mu opioid receptor antagonist
 TM-38837 - another peripherally selective cannabinoid antagonist

References 

AM cannabinoids

CB1 receptor antagonists
Peripherally selective drugs